ERF Medien e. V.  is a German evangelical media corporation, based in Wetzlar, Hesse. The Corporation is producing Radio- and TV as well as online content with Christian-evangelical messages. The organization was founded in 1959 as Evangeliums-Rundfunk (ERF) (gospel broadcast). Theologically, ERF Medien is close to the Evangelical Alliance in Germany. ERF is partner of Trans World Radio.

The funding is almost exclusively through donations from listeners, viewers, online users and friends with annual revenues of 17.3 million euros (as of 2018). In addition, there is an ERF Foundation since 2001,whose statutory purpose is to provide financial support to the broadcaster.

The TV program ERF1 is distributed via Satellite (DVB-S at Astra 1M), Live-stream and since April 1, 2009 also in some digital cable networks in Germany (DVB-C).

References

External links

Evangelical radio stations
German-language radio stations